Bruno Alexandre Carvalho Lopes (born 11 April 1984) is a Portuguese football manager and former player. He is the current manager of Brazilian club Bahia's under-23 squad.

Career
Born in Coimbra, Lopes only played amateur football as a senior, and started coaching after retiring. After working in the youth categories of F.C. Ferreiras and Imortal D.C., he moved to the United States and was an assistant coach at Dayton Dutch Lions and Cincinnati Dutch Lions.

Upon returning to Portugal, Lopes joined António Folha's staff at Portimonense S.C., initially as a scout. In January 2019, he was named manager of the club's under-23 squad, after Luís Boa Morte left.

On 19 January 2020, Lopes was appointed interim manager of Portimonense's main squad, after Folha was sacked. He managed the club for three matches before returning to his previous role.

On 7 September 2020, Lopes was named manager of Welsh club Cefn Druids. He was dismissed the following 10 March, and took over Bahia's under-23 side on 14 June 2021.

References

External links

1984 births
Living people
Sportspeople from Coimbra
Portuguese footballers
Portuguese football managers
Primeira Liga managers
Portimonense S.C. managers
Cefn Druids A.F.C. managers
Esporte Clube Bahia managers
Portuguese expatriate football managers
Portuguese expatriate sportspeople in the United States
Portuguese expatriate sportspeople in Wales
Portuguese expatriate sportspeople in Brazil
Expatriate soccer managers in the United States
Expatriate football managers in Wales
Expatriate football managers in Brazil
Association footballers not categorized by position